Craig Gillespie (born 1 September 1967) is an Australian-American film, television, music video, and commercial director. He is best known for directing the films Lars and the Real Girl (2007), Fright Night (2011), I, Tonya (2017), and Cruella (2021).

Early life
Born and raised in Sydney, Gillespie moved to New York City at the age of nineteen to study illustration, graphic design and advertising at Manhattan's School of Visual Arts. Gillespie stated he had grown up as an atheist.

Career
Gillespie started out as an intern at ad agency J. Walter Thompson, New York. He then moved on to D'Arcy Masius Benton & Bowles, BBDO, Deutsch, and Ammirati & Puris, first as an art director, later as a creative director. After eight years working on the agency side he moved into directing in 1995. Based on the strength of his spec reel and agency experience, he gained representation by production company Fahrenheit Films in late 1995. One year later, he signed with Coppos Films. He has been with MJZ since 2000 and continues to work as a commercial director, commonly working with cinematographers Masanobu Takayanagi and Rodrigo Prieto. Following nominations in 2001 and 2002 in the Directors Guild of America Award category for "Outstanding Directorial Achievement in Commercials", he won in 2006 for his Ameriquest and Altoids commercials. He also won a Golden Lion Award at 2005's Cannes Lions International Advertising Festival, and two of his commercials belong to the Museum of Modern Art in Midtown Manhattan's permanent collection. His commercial for Snickers featuring Betty White playing backyard football was voted the top ad of Super Bowl XLIV by USA Today and is credited with renewing public interest in the actress.

Gillespie's debut feature film was 2007's Mr. Woodcock. He left the project after several negative test screenings, and many scenes were re-written and re-shot. David Dobkin replaced Gillespie in the director's role. Upon initially receiving the script, Gillespie had assumed that audiences would respond well to the dark humor he had been using in his commercials, but, according to him, "it was obvious the audience wanted a broader comedy, not the one I'd made. I appreciated the predicament New Line was in, so I stepped aside." Less than a month after principal photography of Mr. Woodcock concluded, Gillespie set up pre-production of Lars and the Real Girl.  He had had the Lars script for four years but had not yet attached any cast members or a studio. He had first read the script before he was attached to Mr. Woodcock, but the pitch for Lars and the Real Girl—a man falling in love with a sex doll—which he had almost turned down himself, believing the premise to be an "absurd notion", put off many major studios. He chose to direct Mr. Woodcock first.

Gillespie directed several episodes, including the pilot, of the first season of Steven Spielberg and Diablo Cody's television series The United States of Tara. He was set to re-team with Lars and the Real Girl lead actor Ryan Gosling for Dallas Buyers Club, a film telling the true story of Ron Woodroof, an electrician given six months to live after he was diagnosed with AIDS, but used a variety of drugs which he smuggled to other AIDS patients to live for another six years. However, the directing job instead went to Jean-Marc Vallée and Matthew McConaughey as Ron Woodroof. In March 2010, it was announced that Gillespie would direct the Fright Night remake, starring Colin Farrell, Anton Yelchin and Toni Collette for the lead roles.  Gillespie and Sam Worthington won the 2009 Australians in Film Breakthrough Award.

In 2011, he directed the music video for Kid Cudi's single, "No One Believes Me". Gillsespie finalized his contract to direct an adaptation of Pride and Prejudice and Zombies on 18 April 2011. but he later left the film.  In April 2014, it was announced that Gillespie would direct the film The Finest Hours about the Coast Guard who tries to save the crews of two oil tankers in 1952. Chris Pine, Casey Affleck, Josh Stewart, Graham McTavish and Kyle Gallner star in the film for Walt Disney Pictures. The sets for the film were made in Quincy, Massachusetts.

Gillespie directed I, Tonya (2017), a biographical film about figure skater Tonya Harding, starring Margot Robbie, Sebastian Stan and Allison Janney. In December 2018, it was announced that Gillespie would replace Alex Timbers (due to the latter's scheduling conflicts) as director for Disney's live-action spin-off of One Hundred and One Dalmatians titled Cruella, with Emma Stone  portraying Cruella de Vil; the film premiered on May 28, 2021. In June 2021, it was announced that he would return to direct a sequel to Cruella. In April 2022, Gillespie signed on to direct a film adaptation of the Ben Mezrich book The Antisocial Network for Metro-Goldwyn-Mayer, with filming set to begin in the late summer or early autumn.

Filmography

Film

Television

Music videos
Kid Cudi - “No One Believes Me”

Commercials
 7-Eleven - "Belly Flop", "Ducks"
 Acura - "Transactions"
 Aerial Communications - "Lost"
 Altoids - "Fruit Bat", "Mother Tongue", "People of Pain"
 Ameriquest - "Robbery", "Surprise Dinner", "Mother-in-Law", "Parking Meter", "Doctor", "Friendly Skies", "Concert"
 Audi - "Commander", "Driver", "New Santa"
 Bud Light - "Groupies"
 Call of Duty - "Codnapped", "Ultimate Team"
 CareerBuilder - "Job Fairy", "Casual Friday"
 Cars.com - "David Abernathy", "Timothy Richman"
CDW/Cisco - "Dysfunction by Aging Rock Stars. Orchestration by CDW."
 Citi - "Dressing Up", "Mountain", "Runner"
 Consumers Energy - "Milk", "Dog Dish"
 DirecTV - "Chair", "Chinese Food", "Vase"
 Dunkin' Donuts - "Joke", "Parking Lot", "Phone"
 Emerald Nuts/Pop Secret - "Awesomer"
 ESPN - "Alarm Clocks", "Paper Jam"
 FedEx - "Drafting", "Gin Rummy", "Perspective"
 FirstNBC - "Refund", "Rich Guy"
 Fruit of the Loom - "Boxers", "Ceremonial Fruit", "Shirts"
 GEICO - "Balding", "CEO", "House", "Rapper", "Soap"
 Guinness - "Slide"
 Holiday Inn Express - "Jeopardy"
 H&R Block - "Where's Your W-2?", "Brad or Chad"
 Infiniti - "Holiday Shopping"
 Kraft Dinner - "Romantic Dinner"
 Icehouse - "Rain Delay", "Dinner Party", "Support Group"
 Jack Link's Beef Jerky - "Binoculars", "Salt Shaker", "Shaving Cream", "Waterbowl"
 Mercedes-Benz - "Bawling/Penguin", "It's Ready"
 Miracle Whip - "Man's Best Friend"
 Molson Canadian - "Close to You"
 Mountain Dew - "Defeated"
 MSN - "Hotel", "Mr. Snookums", "Name Game", "Quiz", "Rad"
 Nike - "The Roger Effect"
 Nintendo DS - "Race", "Teamwork"
 Nintendo DSi - "Hanging Out"
 Nissan Altima - "Break-Up"
 Obama - "Maverick"
 Pepsi - "Magnetic Attraction"
 Porsche - "Dinner", "Sound"
 Qwest - "Crib"
 Saturn - "Convoy"
 Snickers - "Game", "Road Trip", "Coach", "Cards"
 Southwest Airlines - "Locked Car"
 Subway - "Cupid"
 TAG Body Spray - "Disclaimer Mom", "Fast Acting"
 The St. Paul - "Noah"
 Toyota - "Adrenalitis", "Bed", "Living the Dream", "Rail System"
 Toys "R" Us - "Periscope Up", "Spaceship", "Standoff"
 Twix - "Ideologies", "Merger"
 US West - "Cry"
 Volkswagen - "Dancing", "Hike", "Yoga"
 Washington Mutual - "Julie", "Roy", "Bill B Gone", "Insta-Branch", "Money Shrub", "Teller Porter", "Debra", "Tom", "Jenn", "Paul", "Brandon", "Geoffrey"
 World Championship Wrestling : "HOV", "Couch", "Voodoo"
 Wrigley's - "No Dummy"
 Yahoo! - "Bully", "Garden", "Recall"

References

External links

Commercial showreel at MJZ

1967 births
Living people
Advertising directors
Australian atheists
Australian expatriates in the United States
Australian film directors
Film directors from New York City
People from Sydney
School of Visual Arts alumni
Directors Guild of America Award winners